USCGC Manowar (WPB-87330) is an  long  of the United States Coast Guard built by Bollinger Shipyards in Lockport, Louisiana and was the thirtieth vessel commissioned in her class. Manowar is homeported at Galveston, Texas and her primary missions are ports, waterways and coastal security, search and rescue, law enforcement, marine environmental response, recreational boating safety and military readiness. She was commissioned in 2001.

See also
 List of United States Coast Guard cutters

References

External links

 

Marine Protector-class coastal patrol boats
Patrol vessels of the United States
Ships of the United States Coast Guard
2001 ships
Ships built in Lockport, Louisiana